Alen Floričić (born 1968) is a Croatian artist, working in ambient and installation art.  Born in Pula, Istria, Floricic began his art career after graduating from a sculpture school in Rijeka in 1993.  He currently lives and works in Rabac.

He worked with individual paintings and sculptures in the 1990s.  More recently he has worked in  urban installations, ambient art, and artistic videos.

References 
 List of recent exhibitions
 Profile at the-artists.org
 Video stills from a recent work
 Umjetnost s porukom 

Croatian artists
1968 births
Living people
People from Pula